Trimarco v. Klein Ct. of App. of N.Y., 56 N.Y.2d 98, 436 N.E.2d 502 (1982) is a 1982 decision by the New York Court of Appeals dealing with the use of custom in determining whether a person acted reasonably given the situation. It is commonly studied in introductory U.S. tort law classes.

Facts

Trimarco (P) appealed an order which reversed  a judgment in favor of P and dismissed P's complaint in a negligence action for personal injuries.

P was severely injured when he fell through the glass door enclosing his tub in his apartment he was renting. It was not possible for P or his wife to determine if the glass was tempered or just ordinary glass. After the accident, the glass was found to be just ordinary glass. P sued Klein (D), his landlord, for the injuries. At trial, P introduced expert evidence about the custom and usage of tempered glass from 1956 to 1976. Since at least the early 1950s, a practice of using shatterproof glazing materials for bathroom enclosures had come into common use, so that by 1976 the glass door here no longer conformed to accepted safety standards.  P also showed that over this period bulletins of nationally recognized safety and consumer organizations along with official Federal publications had joined in warning of the dangers that lurked when plain glass was utilized in "hazardous locations", including "bathtub enclosures". Over objection, the trial court also allowed in sections of New York's General Business Law, which, as of July 1, 1973, required, on pain of criminal sanctions, that only "safety glazing material" be used in all bathroom enclosures. D's managing agent admitted that, since at least 1965, it was customary for landlords who had occasion to install glass for shower enclosures, to replace the glass with "some material such as plastic or safety glass". P was given the verdict by the jury. The appellate division reversed the decision awarding P damages; D was under no common law duty to replace the glass unless he had prior notice of the danger. P appealed. The Court of Appeals reversed and ordered a new trial.

Judgment
The question asked was, does custom and usage per se fix the scope of the reasonable person standard? 
The response of the court was, custom and usage is highly relevant evidence related to the reasonable person standard but it does not per se define the scope of negligence.

Judge Jacob D. Fuchsberg gave the following decision.

Legal analysis
Custom and usage evidence is highly relevant to a determination of whether an actor used reasonable care under the circumstances. Such evidence tends to show that taking the omitted precaution that resulted in harm was technologically and economically feasible and that the harm itself was foreseeable. Custom and usage evidence is not treated as negligence per se: the jury or fact finder must still determine if the custom and usage is reasonable. Thus, custom and usage are merely evidence of what ought to be done (often highly persuasive evidence), but evidence of custom and usage must still be reconciled with the reasonable person standard. Custom and usage are not conclusive evidence of negligence.

See also
US tort law
T.J.Hooper, 60 F.2d 737 (2d Cir. 1932) (opinion by Judge Learned Hand).

External links

United States tort case law
New York (state) state case law
1982 in United States case law
1982 in New York (state)